Matthew Hussey (born 19 June 1987) is a British life coach, YouTube personality, and writer. He is known for his 2013 bestseller, Get The Guy: Learn Secrets of the Male Mind to Find the Man You Want and the Love You Deserve.

Early life
Hussey was born in Essex, England on 19 June 1987 to Stephen and Pauline Hussey. He has two brothers.

Career
Hussey began working as a life coach in his late teens, and in 2008 began working as a dating coach for women aged in their 20s to 60s. Initially Hussey was a dating coach for men.

In 2010 he moved to the United States and attracted a following which included actresses Eva Longoria and Tyra Banks.

In 2013 he released a book which became a New York Times bestseller, entitled Get The Guy: Learn Secrets of the Male Mind to Find the Man You Want and the Love You Deserve.

He has had a column in Cosmopolitan since 2015 and offers Get the Guy online tutorials, 7-hour seminars and $4,000 retreats periodically in the UK and the United States. Seminars include diagnostics, gendered advice on how to approach and offers lines and text messages tailored to various situations. The $10,000/hr price tag on his one-on-one coaching has attracted media attention and some controversy.

He is a life coach, YouTube personality. Hussey's brother Stephen often appears on videos on Hussey's YouTube channel and writes content for Hussey's site.

He hosted the radio show Love Life with Matthew Hussey. He has also made many television appearances, including being the matchmaker on NBC's Ready for Love. He has been the resident love expert on the Today Show.

Views 
He encourages women to set their standards, be confident but challenging and have a fulfilled life to attract men. He helps women face the challenges of technology-driven dating. He advises that women approach men by asking for a favour.

Personal life
In 2018, Hussey was in a relationship with singer Camila Cabello after he met her while on The Today Show. They broke up in 2019. In 2022, he became engaged, as per a recent Instagram post.

References

External links

Living people
1987 births
British relationships and sexuality writers
People from Essex
English YouTubers